Dicercini is a tribe of metallic wood-boring beetles in the family Buprestidae. There are more than 30 genera and over 750 described species in Dicercini.

Genera
These genera belong to the tribe Dicercini:

 Achardella Obenberger 1926
 Apateum Spinola, 1837
 Archepsila Holynski, 2001
 Asidoptera Obenberger, 1923
 Barrellus Nelson & Bellamy, 1996
 Capnodis Eschscholtz 1829
 Cardiaspis Saunders, 1866
 Chalcopoecila Thomson, 1878
 Cyphosoma Mannerheim 1837
 Dicerca Eschscholtz, 1829
 Dicercomorpha Alekseev, 1994
 Ectinogonia Spinola, 1837
 Gyascutus LeConte, 1858
 Haplotrinchus Kerremans, 1903
 Hippomelas Laporte & Gory, 1837
 Holynskirbus Özdikmen 2008
 Icarina Alluaud, 1896
 Lampetis Dejean, 1833
 Latipalpis Solier, 1833
 Monosacra Thomson, 1878
 Oedisterna Lacordaire, 1857
 Perotis Dejean 1833
 Phelix Marseul, 1865
 Polybothris Spinola, 1837
 Prasinalia Casey, 1909
 Pseudolampetis Obenberger, 1926
 Pseudoperotis Obenberger, 1936
 Psiloptera Dejean, 1833
 Strandissa Obenberger, 1936
 Tokaranodicerca Hattori, 2004
 Touzalinia Théry, 1923
 Zoolrecordia Holynski, 2006

References

External links

 

Buprestidae
Beetle tribes